Yang Xian (born 31 August 1962) is a Chinese FIDE Master chess player.

He was a member of the Chinese national chess team. He was part of the national team at the Chess Olympiad once in 1986, and twice for the Hong Kong team 1992–1994. He played a total of 33 games scoring 14 wins, 15 draws and 4 losses.

His current (inactive) Elo rating is 2415 according to FIDE.

See also
Chess in China
Hong Kong Chess Federation

References

External links
 
 
 

1962 births
Living people
Chinese chess players
Hong Kong chess players
Chess FIDE Masters